The Choice of Hercules (HWV 69) is an oratorio in one act (three scenes) by George Frideric Handel. Handel produced the score between 28 June and 5 July 1750. The first performance was given  on 1 March 1751 at the Covent Garden Theatre, London with Cecilia Young as Virtue, Isabella Young as Hercules, and Thomas Lowe as attendant. The libretto is derived from the poem (1743) of Robert Lowth but revised, probably, by Thomas Morell.

The story centres on the Choice of Hercules, in which the youthful Hercules must decide between the paths of pleasure and virtue. These are represented by two women who present their various arguments to Hercules, and his confusion is articulated in the trio Where shall I go?. The classical myth of "the choice of Hercules," as told by the 5th-century Athenian sophist Prodicus (Xenophon Memorabilia 2.1.21-34), anticipates that Hercules will choose to follow Virtue's path. And, indeed, the Chorus sings ( Chorus, 24) that "Virtue will place thee in that blest abode, Crown'd with immortal youth, Among the gods a god!"

The character of The Attendant on Pleasure is introduced into this version of the Choice of Hercules and complicates Hercules' choice (Air, 16).

A typical performance takes almost 50 minutes.

The work includes the notable aria Yet can I hear that dulcet lay.

Dramatis personae
 Hercules (alto)
 Pleasure (soprano)
 Virtue (alto)
 An Attendant on Pleasure (tenor)
 Chorus

Movements 
The work has the following movements:

Recordings
Hyperion Records label received the 2003 International Handel Recording Prize for their recording of The Choice of Hercules.

 Conductor: Robert King
 Pleasure: Susan Gritton
 Virtue: Alice Coote
 Hercules: Robin Blaze
 An Attendant on Pleasure: Charles Daniels
 The Choir of The King's Consort
 The King's Consort

External links
 Complete Libretto hosted by Stanford University
 
 Richard Dyer, Cecilia opens with 'Choice' Handel (review of Boston Cecilia production), The Boston Globe, 8 November 2005

Oratorios by George Frideric Handel
1750 compositions